Azizur Rahman Mallick (December 31, 1918 – February 4, 1997) was a Bangladeshi historian and educationist.

Early life and education
Mallick was born in Dhaka district. He spent his early life in Rangoon, Burma. He and his family returned to Dhaka when he was at seventh grade. He passed SSC from Manikganj Model High School in 1934 and HSC from Dhaka College in 1936. He studied History at Dhaka University, completing bachelor's degree in 1939 and master's degree in 1940. The following year, he joined the university as a lecturer, and he had further teaching stints at Chittagong College and Rajshahi College. After World War II, he went to London, where he completed his PhD in History in 1953 from SOAS the School of Oriental and African Studies, University of London. His advisor was Dr CH Philips.

Career

Upon returning from London, Mallick joined the history department at Rajshahi University. He eventually rose to become Dean of the Arts faculty. He also taught South Asian history at the University of Pennsylvania. He was the founding vice-chancellor of Chittagong University; the work of establishing the university was undertaken in 1964-65 and it was formally inaugurated in 1966.

Mallick was actively involved in the Bangladesh liberation movement and, after independence in 1971, held a series of important government posts. He was the first education secretary and the first ambassador to India, Nepal and Bhutan. In 1974-75, he replaced Tajuddin Ahmad as the finance minister. He joined Mostaq Ahmad cabinet  immediately after assassination of Sheikh Mujibur Rahman. He took oath under the Khondaker Mostaq Ahmad leadership on August 20, 1975 and remain until the cabinet dissolved.  

Mallick served as president of the Asiatic Society of Bangladesh and Bangladesh Itihas Samiti, and chairman of the Bangla Academy. His books include British Policy and the Muslims in Bengal and Amar Jibon Kotha O Bangladesher Mukti Sangram (My Life Story and the Independence Movement of Bangladesh). He died in Dhaka on 4 February 1997.

References

1997 deaths
Bangladeshi civil servants
1918 births
Alumni of SOAS University of London
Dhaka College alumni
University of Dhaka alumni
Academic staff of Jahangirnagar University
Vice-Chancellors of the University of Chittagong
Honorary Fellows of Bangla Academy
Bangladesh Krishak Sramik Awami League central committee members